Nebojša Milošević (born 30 June 1973) is a Serbian professional football manager who is currently working as an assistant manager at Serbian SuperLiga club Red Star Belgrade.

As a manager, he so far managed BSK Borča, Rad, Radnik Bijeljina and El Gouna. Milošević has also been an assistant manager at Red Star Belgrade on three occasions, currently serving his third one since December 2019, and has also been an assistant at Changchun Yatai and Riga.

Managerial statistics

References

External links
Nebojša Milošević at Soccerway

1973 births
Living people
Sportspeople from Kragujevac
Serbian football managers
Expatriate football managers in Bosnia and Herzegovina
Expatriate football managers in Egypt
Expatriate football managers in the United Arab Emirates
Serbian SuperLiga managers
Premier League of Bosnia and Herzegovina managers
Egyptian Premier League managers
UAE Pro League managers
Red Star Belgrade non-playing staff
FK BSK Borča managers
FK Rad managers
FK Radnik Bijeljina managers
El Gouna FC managers
Al Dhafra FC managers